St. Sylvester can refer to:
Saint Sylvester (disambiguation)
Saint-Sylvestre (disambiguation)

See also
San Silvestre (disambiguation)
San Silvestro (disambiguation)
Sylvester
Sylvestre (disambiguation)